Sean Green may refer to:

 Sean Green (baseball), relief pitcher
 Sean Green (basketball)
 Sean Green (Heretic), peasant

See also
 Shawn Green (disambiguation)
 Shonn Greene, American football player
 Sean Greene - American skateboarder